FinBank Burundi, also known as Finbank, is a commercial bank in Burundi, licensed by the Bank of the Republic of Burundi, the central bank and national banking regulator. The bank, established in 2002, was between 2008 and 2014 a subsidiary and a component of the Access Bank Group.

Location
The headquarters of the bank are located at Boulevard De L’Independence, in Bujumbura, the largest city and former capital of Burundi. The coordinates of the bank's headquarters are 3°23'06.0"S, 29°22'19.0"E (Latitude:-3.385005; Longitude:29.371943).

Overview
FinBank incorporated as a leasing finance company, under the name Finalease, in 2000. Two years later, it was granted a commercial banking license. It began commercial banking activities in 2003, changing its name to FinBank. In 2008, the Access Bank Group acquired majority shareholding in FinBank Burundi. In early 2014, Access Bank plc divested its interest in the bank to Dillux S.A, an investment company incorporated in Mauritius.

Branch network
As of April 2016, FinBank Burundi maintained the following networked branches:

 Head Office Branch – Boulevard De L’Independence, Bujumbura
 API Branch  – Boulevard De La Liberte, Bujumbura
 Asiatique Branch – Bujumbura
 Market Branch – Rumonge Market, Rumonge
 Gitega Branch – Gitega

See also
List of banks in Burundi

References

External links
Website of FinBank Burundi

Banks of Burundi
Banks established in 2002
2002 establishments in Burundi
Bujumbura